CVS Caremark (formerly Caremark Rx) (stylized as , previously CVS/caremark) is the prescription benefit management subsidiary of CVS Health, headquartered in Woonsocket, Rhode Island.

Company history
Caremark was founded as a physician and pharmacy benefits management company in 1993. It was founded in Birmingham, Alabama as MedPartners, Inc. by former HealthSouth Corporation chief executive Richard Scrushy. New Enterprise Associates was an initial investor in the company. MedPartners went public in February of 1995. In August 1995, MedPartners announced the acquisition of Mullikin Medical Enterprises, a physician management company. In December 1995, MedPartners acquired Pacific Physicians Services in Redlands, California. 

On May 15, 1996, Caremark International, a provider of manager health services, announced it would be acquired by MedPartners. Caremark International was founded as a unit of Baxter International and was spun off from Baxter in 1992 as a publicly traded company.

In October 1997, PhyCor, announced they would acquire MedPartners for $8 billion in stock and assumed debt. However, the merger agreement was terminated in January 1998, with the companies citing significant operational and strategic differences as the reason for the termination of the merger. 

In January 1998, Chairman, President and CEO Larry House left the company and Richard Scrushy took over as chairman and acting CEO of the company. In 1998, Edwin "Mac" Crawford became the new president and CEO of MedPartners. After taking over, Crawford announced that MedPartners was exiting its PPM business and refocusing on its PBM business.

2000 to present 
In 2000, MedPartners changed its name to Caremark Rx.

In 2003, it merged with AdvancePCS. That same year, Caremark moved its headquarters from Birmingham, Alabama, to Nashville, Tennessee.

In March 2007, Caremark merged with CVS Corporation to create CVS Caremark.

In August 2008, CVS Caremark purchased Longs Drugs Stores for $2.7 billion. 

In 2009, CVS Caremark agreed to pay $2.25 million to settle alleged unfair trade practices and alleged violations of the privacy protections under the Health Insurance Portability and Accountability Act of 1996. Also in 2009, CVS Caremark agreed to repay $2.8 million to consumers who purchased AirShield tablets and powders, which were marketed as being able to prevent illness, after it was alleged that the marketing for the product made misleading claims.

In 2013, CVS Caremark announced the acquisition of Coram LLC, a drug infusion business, for $2.1 billion.

In 2014, the corporate name for CVS Caremark became CVS Health, with CVS Caremark becoming a subsidiary.

In May 2018, a whistleblower lawsuit was filed against CVS Caremark alleging fraud by. The whistleblower alleged that CVS Caremark was charging Medicaid and Medicare customers more for their prescriptions than was appropriate.

In January 2019, Walmart announced that it would no longer use CVS Caremark as its pharmacy benefit manager.

In January 2020, CVS Caremark announced RxZero, a program that would allow patients with diabetes to pay no copays. In February 2020, Alan Lotvin was appointed president of CVS Caremark.

References

External links
 

1993 establishments in Alabama
2007 mergers and acquisitions
American companies established in 1993
American corporate subsidiaries
Companies based in Providence County, Rhode Island
Corporate spin-offs
Caremark
Health care companies based in Rhode Island
Health care companies established in 1993
Pharmacy benefit management companies based in the United States
Woonsocket, Rhode Island